Martine Delvaux (born December 10, 1968) is a Canadian writer from Montreal, Quebec. She is most noted for her 2015 novel Blanc dehors, which was a shortlisted finalist for the Governor General's Award for French-language fiction at the 2016 Governor General's Awards.

She is a professor of literature and women's studies at the Université du Québec à Montréal.

Works

Fiction
 Ventriloquies (2003, with Catherine Mavrikakis)
 Échographies (2007)
 C'est quand le bonheur? (2007)
 Rose amer (2009)
 Les Cascadeurs de l'amour n'ont pas droit au doublage (2012)
 Blanc dehors (2015)

Non-fiction
 Femmes psychatrisées, femmes rebelles. De l'étude de cas à la narration autobiographique (1998)
 Histoire de fantômes. Spectralité et témoignage dans les récits de femmes contemporains (2006) 
 Les Filles en série. Des Barbies aux Pussy Riot (2013)
 Nan Goldin. Guerrière et gorgone (2014)
 Le monde est à toi (2017)
 Thelma, Louise et moi (2018)
 Le boys club (2020)

References

1968 births
Living people
Canadian novelists in French
Canadian non-fiction writers in French
Canadian women novelists
Canadian women non-fiction writers
French Quebecers
Writers from Montreal
Writers from Quebec City
Academic staff of the Université du Québec à Montréal
21st-century Canadian novelists
21st-century Canadian non-fiction writers
21st-century Canadian women writers